Lucas Alberto Sugo Rodríguez (born April 15, 1978) is a Uruguayan singer and songwriter. He began his career in 2002, as a vocalist and guitarist for the band called Sonido Profesional. 

In 2014, Sugo released his single "Cinco minutos", which became a hit and brought him national and international recognition. He has performed in venues such as the Teatro Gran Rex in Buenos Aires and the Antel Arena in Montevideo. He has been awarded Gold, Platinum and Double Platinum records, and in 2020 the Graffiti Award for Best Artist of the Year.

Early life 
Sugo was born in Tacuarembó, but at the age of 2 his family moved to Rivera, on the border with Brazil. He is of Italian descent. His mother, Lucía Rodríguez is a composer of texts and melodies, and it was she who instilled music in him since he was a child. He did not have a bond with his father, whom he saw few times during his life. He has a brother, Martín.

He attended Primary School No. 1 in Rivera. At the age of eight, he entered the Eduardo Fabini School of Music. Later he attended the América Conservatory and the Melody Conservatory, obtaining the title of Professor of guitar, piano and singing.

Music career 
In 2002, before he began to work as a teacher, he was summoned by the band Sonido Profesional to replace Mario Silva as vocalist and guitarist. 

In 2013 he began his career as a soloist, being accompanied by a band, of which he was the lead vocalist. In December of that year, he released his video clip "Lluvia", a song he sang during his time at Sonido Profesional.

On January 14, 2014, he released his single "Cinco minutos". In 2015, he released a new version of the video for the single. It was shot in San Ramón, and was produced by Indias Film and Montevideo Music Group. Soccer players like Cristian Rodríguez contributed to the success of the single, who appeared at the celebration of the victory of Atlético de Madrid in La Liga, listening to the song.
In September 2019, he was the host of the talk show "A solas con Lucas Sugo", in which he interviews well-known singers, both from Uruguay and Argentina, including Luciano Pereyra, Valeria Lynch and Agustín Casanova. In November 2021 it was announced that Sugo would join La Voz as a coach for its first season in 2022.

Discography 

 Sentimientos encontrados (2014)
 Vida mía (2016)
 Canciones que amo (2018)
 En vivo en el Solís (2019)
 Sentimiento y pasión (2020)

Filmography

Personal life 
He is currently in a relationship with Antonella García, with whom he welcomed their first baby together, Isabella, who was born on December 8, 2021. He has two more children, Florencia Victoria and Lucas Agustín, from a previous marriage.

References

External links 
 

Living people
1978 births
21st-century Uruguayan male singers
Uruguayan songwriters
Uruguayan people of Italian descent